Zuwara Stadium is a multi-purpose stadium in Zuwara, Libya.  It is currently used mostly for football matches and is the home ground of Aljazeera Sports Club.  The stadium holds 2,000 people.

References

External links
Stadium information

Football venues in Libya
Multi-purpose stadiums in Libya